Portfolio may refer to:

Objects 
 Portfolio (briefcase), a type of briefcase

Collections 
 Portfolio (finance), a collection of assets held by an institution or a private individual
 Artist's portfolio, a sample of an artist's work or a case used to display artwork, photographs etc.
 Career portfolio, an organized presentation of an individual's education, work samples, and skills
 Electronic portfolio, a collection of electronic documents
 IT portfolio, in IT portfolio management, the portfolio of large classes of items of enterprise Information Technology
 Patent portfolio, a collection of patents owned by a single entity
 Project portfolio, in project portfolio management, the portfolio of projects in an organization
 Ministry (government department), the post and responsibilities of a head of a government department

Computing 
 Atari Portfolio, a palmtop computer
 Extensis Portfolio, a digital asset manager

Media 
 The Portfolio, a British fine arts magazine published from 1870 to 1893
 Portfolio Magazine, an American fine arts magazine published from 1979 to 1983
 Portfolio (Grace Jones album)
 Portfolio (Yolandita Monge album)
 Portfolio.com, a business magazine
 Portfolio: An Intercontinental Quarterly, a cross-disciplinary literary journal published between 1945 and 1947
 Portfolio, 1949 graphic design magazine by Alexey Brodovitch
 Portfolio (publisher), a business imprint of Penguin Group in the United States

People 
 Almerindo Portfolio (1878–1966), businessman and New York City Treasurer

See also
 B.C.G. Analysis
 Minister without portfolio
 Port Folio (disambiguation)
 Portfolio company
 Portfolio investment
 Portfolio management (disambiguation)